The 1967 Pacific hurricane season started on June 1 and ended on November 30, 1967. The season was of little note except for Hurricanes Katrina and Olivia. Katrina made landfall on the Baja Peninsula, killing at least 60 and made 2,500 homeless. Olivia made landfall on the eastern side of the Baja Peninsula as a major hurricane—only one of two storms ever to do so. Hurricane/Typhoon Sarah formed in the Central Pacific and reached category 1 strength before crossing over to the Western Pacific.



Systems

Tropical Depression One

On May 18, the first tropical depression of the season formed. It remained weak and dissipated the next day far out at sea.

Tropical Storm Agatha

The first tropical storm of the season formed on June 7 at peak intensity far off from any landmass. It remained at peak intensity until it was stopped being tracked on the 10th.

Tropical Storm Bridget

On June 16, a tropical storm was identified south of Mexico with winds of 45 mph ( /h). It weakened as it approached the Mexican mainland and dissipated later that day.

Hurricane Carlotta

The first hurricane of the season, Hurricane Carlotta formed on June 23 near the Mexican coast. The storm gradually strengthened and became the next day. The storm stayed as a hurricane until June 25. It rapidly weakened and was stopped being tracked on June 26 south of the Baja Peninsula of Mexico.

Tropical Storm Denise

On July 6, a tropical depression formed south of Mexico. The depression had its origin in a loosely organized area of squalls which had first appeared on satellite photos late on July 5. It strengthened to a tropical storm on the 9th and was named Denise. On July 15, Denise, now in the Central Pacific weakened into a tropical depression. The depression dissipated south-west of Hawaii on July 18, never threatening land.

Tropical Storm Eleanor

A few days after Denise formed, a new tropical depression formed south-west of the Baja Peninsula. It strengthened into a tropical storm late that night and was named Eleanor. It weakened into a tropical depression three days later, on July 16. The depression continued a long journey north-westward until July 22, when it dissipated. Eleanor never threatened land.

Tropical Storm Francene

On July 24, the sixth tropical storm of the season was identified relatively close to the Mexican coast. The storm continued a north-westward direction until it dissipated south of the Baja Peninsula.

Tropical Storm Georgette

On July 25, a tropical depression was found far from any landmass. It reached tropical storm strength the next day and was named Georgette. It dissipated on July 30.

Tropical Depression Hilary

On August 10, another tropical depression formed south of the Baja California Peninsula. It moved northwestward until it dissipated the next day.

Hilary reportedly attained Tropical Storm strength, however the system's best track by the NHC does support the strength, and in post-storm analysis, Hilary was downgraded into a depression.

Tropical Storm Ilsa

On August 12, the eighth named storm of the year formed and was named Ilsa. The storm weakened rapidly on the night of the 17th and dissipated the next morning never having affected land.

Hurricane Jewel

On the day Ilsa dissipated, a new tropical storm was found and named Jewel. It rapidly strengthened that night and reached its peak intensity the next morning. It held peak intensity for 24 hours and weakened the next morning to a moderate tropical storm. It dissipated
on the 22nd.

Hurricane Katrina

The first storm to make landfall, Katrina formed on August 30. It became the third hurricane of the season 30 hours after it was named. It emerged soon after and paralleled the peninsula until making landfall at the head of the Bay of California. It rapidly weakened to a tropical depression and dissipated over Arizona. In Mexico, Katrina caused significant damage to parts of San Felipe. A total of 2500 people were left homeless and 60 ships were sunk. At least one person was killed.

Hurricane Lily

On September 5, a tropical storm formed and was named Lily. Lily became the season's fourth hurricane on the night of September 6. It weakened to a tropical storm and dissipated as a tropical cyclone on the 11th, though its surface circulation continued drifting westward near the 30th parallel north and remained identifiable on weather satellite images through the 20th.

Hurricane Sarah

On September 11, Sarah became a hurricane for twelve hours, before weakening to a tropical storm. Sarah then regained hurricane status crossed into the Western Pacific. The only measured pressure reading from Sarah was found in the Western Pacific, .

Tropical Storm Monica

On September 13, a tropical storm formed south of the Baja Peninsula and was named Monica. It weakened to a tropical depression the next morning and stayed that way until September 19. It became a tropical storm again but never regained peak intensity. It dissipated on September 20.

Tropical Storm Nanette

On September 13, another tropical depression formed directly south of Mexico. Twelve hours later, it became the fourteenth tropical storm of the season, Nanette.

Hurricane Olivia

The only major hurricane of the season, Olivia formed on October 6 as a tropical depression. It slowly strengthened and became a tropical storm 3 days later. As a tropical storm, Olivia again took a long time to become a hurricane. It headed north-northeast and hit Baja California with 50 mph winds. On the 13th, Olivia finally became a hurricane, while in the Gulf of California. Olivia rapidly weakened even faster than it strengthened and dissipated 18 hours after landfall.

Olivia is only one of two major hurricanes to make landfall on eastern side of the Baja California Peninsula the other being Hurricane Kiko of 1989. It was also the first major hurricane to be named in the East Pacific. No damage figures exist from Olivia, due to the scarce population of the area it struck. However, a total of 61 people died.

Hurricane Priscilla

The final hurricane of the season formed on October 14 south of central Mexico as a tropical storm. It became a hurricane two days later. Priscilla stayed a hurricane for 48 hours until it weakened into a tropical storm on the 18th as it curved westward. It dissipated on October 20.

Tropical Storm Ramona

On October 21, the final tropical storm of the season formed. It became a tropical storm the next morning and was named Ramona. Ramona stayed as a tropical storm until October 25 when it weakened to a tropical depression. The depression again strengthened to a tropical storm on the 29th as the storm started to recurve. The system dissipated while heading due north on November 3.

Other systems
In the Central Pacific, the local hurricane center noted four systems that were likely tropical depressions but not operationally monitored.

Storm names
This was the first use of the following names. The names were used again in 1971.

See also

 List of Pacific hurricanes
 1967 Atlantic hurricane season
 1967 Pacific typhoon season
 1967 North Indian Ocean cyclone season
 Australian region cyclone seasons: 1966–67 1967–68
 South Pacific cyclone seasons: 1966–67 1967–68
 South-West Indian Ocean cyclone seasons: 1966–67 1967–68

References

 
1967
Articles which contain graphical timelines